Kenneth Stewart Baird (February 1, 1951 – December 18, 2016) was a professional ice hockey player who played 332 games in the World Hockey Association and 10 games in the National Hockey League between 1971 and 1978. He played for the NHL's California Golden Seals, then spent six seasons in the WHA with the Edmonton Oilers, Winnipeg Jets and Calgary Cowboys. In 1978 Baird joined Duisburger SC in West Germany, and spent four seasons there before retiring in 1982. Baird later moved to Snow Lake, Manitoba, and died there in December 2016.

Career statistics

Regular season and playoffs

References

External links
 

1951 births
2016 deaths
Calgary Cowboys players
California Golden Seals draft picks
California Golden Seals players
Canadian ice hockey defencemen
Edmonton Oilers (WHA) players
Füchse Duisburg players
Ice hockey people from Manitoba
Sportspeople from Flin Flon
Winnipeg Jets (WHA) players